Nickie may refer to:

People
Nickie is a given name and nickname.

Given name
Nickie Antonio (born 1955), American politician

Nickname
Nickie Hall (born 1959), American gridiron football player
Nickie Quaid (born 1989), Irish hurler

Surname
Owen Nickie, Sint Maarten professional football manager

Other
Nickie Nina, Pakistani fashion label
Nickie, a common name for Hypsophrys nicaraguensis

See also

Nikkie de Jager (born 1994), Dutch makeup artist and beauty vlogger
Nickiesha Wilson (born 1986), Jamaican hurdler
 Nicki
 Nikky
 Niky

Nickey (disambiguation)
Nicky (disambiguation)
 Nikki (disambiguation)
'Nique (disambiguation)

Lists of people by nickname